Miami Township may refer to:

Indiana
Miami Township, Cass County, Indiana

Kansas
Miami Township, Miami County, Kansas, in Miami County, Kansas
Miami Township, Reno County, Kansas, in Reno County, Kansas

Missouri
Miami Township, Saline County, Missouri

Ohio
Miami Township, Clermont County, Ohio
Miami Township, Greene County, Ohio
Miami Township, Hamilton County, Ohio
Miami Township, Logan County, Ohio
Miami Township, Montgomery County, Ohio

Township name disambiguation pages